The Latin Grammy Award for Best Samba/Pagode Album is an honor presented annually at the Latin Grammy Awards, a ceremony that recognizes excellence and creates a wider awareness of cultural diversity and contributions of Latin recording artists in the United States and internationally. The award has been presented since the 1st Annual Latin Grammy Awards in 2000.

According to the category description guide for the 13th Latin Grammy Awards, the award is for vocal or instrumental Samba/Pagode albums containing at least 51% playing time of newly recorded material.  For Solo artists, duos or groups.

Zeca Pagodinho was the first recipient of the award, he is also the artist with most wins in the category with four, followed by Martinho da Vila and Maria Rita with three each, and Mart'nália with two.

Winners and nominees

2000s

2010s

2020s

References

External links
Official site of the Latin Grammy Awards

Samba Pagode Album
Pagode
 *
Latin Grammy Awards for Portuguese language music